Nsutite is a manganese oxide mineral with formula: (Mn4+1−xMn2+xO2-2x(OH)2x where x = 0.06-0.07). It is found in most large manganese deposits and was first discovered in Nsuta, Ghana. Since then, it has been found worldwide. Nsutite is a dull mineral with a hardness of 6.5-8.5 and an average specific gravity of 4.45. Nustite is used as a cathode in zinc–carbon batteries, but synthetic manganese oxide is gradually replacing it.

References

Oxide minerals
Manganese(II,IV) minerals
Hexagonal minerals